James Robert Wilson,  (September 16, 1866 – April 3, 1941) was a Canadian politician.

Born in Almonte, Canada West, he moved to Moose Jaw, Saskatchewan in 1884 and was employed at a grocery and hardware store. During the 1885 North-West Rebellion he led the first medical corps to Saskatoon.  After the rebellion he worked as a farmer, before opening a general store in Saskatoon in 1896.

In January 1903 he was elected overseer over the village of Saskatoon, and when on July 1 of that year the village was incorporated as a town, he became its first mayor.  He served until 1904, and again later as mayor of the by now city of Saskatoon from 1907-1908.  He also sat on the city council from 1914-1919.

In his times as mayor he personally guaranteed a bank loan that allowed for the completion of sewer, water and electrical works, and it was also whilst he was mayor that Saskatoon's City Park was purchased.

Wilson also tried his hand at national politics, standing unsuccessfully as a federal candidate for the Conservatives in 1908, before managing to be elected in 1917.  He served for four years, including a spell as a cabinet minister, before being defeated in 1921.

His brother Russell also served as mayor of Saskatoon.

Wilson Crescent, which runs through Saskatoon's Avalon, Adelaide/Churchill and Nutana Park neighbourhoods, is named in James Wilson's honour.

References

External links
 

1866 births
1941 deaths
Members of the House of Commons of Canada from Saskatchewan
Conservative Party of Canada (1867–1942) MPs
Members of the King's Privy Council for Canada
Mayors of Saskatoon
People from Almonte, Ontario